Henry Hagg Lake (also known simply as Hagg Lake) is an artificial lake in northwest Oregon, in the United States. The reservoir is an impoundment of Scoggins Creek, which drains a small portion of the eastern side of the Northern Oregon Coast Range. The lake and creek are part of the Tualatin River’s watershed in the Tualatin Valley.

Scoggins Dam
Scoggins Dam was built in 1975 by the United States Bureau of Reclamation, which still owns and operates the facility. Hagg Lake contains  of water that can be used. Some water from the lake is used by Clean Water Services to augment the flow of the Tualatin River during the summer months to reduce the temperature and improve water quality. Other users include four cities and the Tualatin Valley Water District.

Ecology and Geology 
In 1967, fossilized shark remains were discovered near the lake.

See also
 List of lakes in Oregon

References

External links

 Entry for the lake in the Atlas of Oregon Lakes

Reservoirs in Oregon
Tualatin River
Lakes of Washington County, Oregon
Protected areas of Washington County, Oregon
Dams in Oregon
United States Bureau of Reclamation dams
Dams completed in 1975
1975 establishments in Oregon